Lionel Essono (born 2 August 1992) is a Cameroonian football player who plays for New Stars Douala.

References

External links

1992 births
Living people
Cameroonian footballers
Cameroonian expatriate footballers
CD San Roque de Lepe footballers
PGS Kissamikos players
Atromitos F.C. players
AO Chania F.C. players
Canon Yaoundé players
Eding Sport FC players
New Star de Douala players
Association football forwards
Cameroonian expatriate sportspeople in Spain
Cameroonian expatriate sportspeople in Greece
Expatriate footballers in Spain
Expatriate footballers in Greece
Cameroon youth international footballers